Syed Muhammad Athar Hussain Shah Gillani (born 24 October 1959) is a Pakistani politician who had been a member of the National Assembly of Pakistan, from June 2013 to May 2018.

Early life
He was born on 10 October 1959.

Political career

He was elected to the National Assembly of Pakistan as a candidate of Pakistan Muslim League (N) (PML-N) from Constituency NA-165 (Pakpattan-II) in 2013 Pakistani general election. He received 71,804 votes and defeated Ahmad Raza Maneka, a candidate of Pakistan Tehreek-e-Insaf (PTI).

References

Living people
Pakistan Muslim League (N) politicians
Punjabi people
Pakistani MNAs 2013–2018
1959 births